Aemilia pagana is a moth of the family Erebidae. It was described by Schaus in 1894. It is found in Brazil.

References

Moths described in 1894
Phaegopterina
Moths of South America